Kevin John Gill (20 September 1961 – 19 April 2020) was a British sports shooter.

Sports shooting career
Gill represented Great Britain at the 1992 Summer Olympics and the 1996 Summer Olympics.

He represented England and won a gold medal in the trap pairs with Ian Peel and a silver medal in the individual trap, at the 1990 Commonwealth Games in Auckland, New Zealand.

He died on 19 April 2020.

References

1961 births
2020 deaths
British male sport shooters
Shooters at the 1990 Commonwealth Games
Commonwealth Games medallists in shooting
Commonwealth Games gold medallists for England
Commonwealth Games silver medallists for England
Olympic shooters of Great Britain
Shooters at the 1992 Summer Olympics
Shooters at the 1996 Summer Olympics
Medallists at the 1990 Commonwealth Games